Stephanie Lewis (born ) is a New Zealand politician and Member of Parliament in the House of Representatives for the Labour Party.

Personal life
Lewis grew up in Whanganui and Waverley. She attended Whanganui City College and Victoria University of Wellington, where she studied law. In 2004 she was a member of the New Zealand Youth Parliament, selected to represent Whanganui MP Jill Pettis.

Lewis worked at the Accident Compensation Corporation (ACC) where she also became a trade union delegate. She later worked for the Privacy Commissioner. Lewis is married to Rob Carr, who was a senior ministerial adviser to Prime Minister Jacinda Ardern.

In February 2022, while she was pregnant, Lewis was harassed by anti-COVID vaccine mandate protestors outside Parliament, who threatened to lynch and kidnap her.

Political career

Lewis won the Labour Party nomination for Whanganui in 2017 ahead of district councillor Philippa Baker-Hogan and moved from Wellington back to Whanganui to campaign full time. Lewis was re-selected as Labour's candidate for Whanganui in the 2020 election. She was elected a week before Labour's annual conference, which was held in Whanganui for the first time in the party's history.

Early returns in the 2020 general election placed her ahead of incumbent Harete Hipango, and she was declared the winner on 18 October 2020 with a majority of approximately 6,800 votes based on preliminary results. Following the release of the final results on 6 November, Lewis' majority increased to 8,191 votes.

References

1980s births
Living people
New Zealand Labour Party MPs
Members of the New Zealand House of Representatives
People educated at Whanganui City College
Victoria University of Wellington alumni
Unsuccessful candidates in the 2017 New Zealand general election
New Zealand Youth MPs
21st-century New Zealand women politicians